Pejaković is a surname. It may refer to:
 Josip Pejaković (born 1948), Bosnian actor and writer
 Nikola Pejaković (born 1966), Serbian actor and singer
 Zlatko Pejaković (born 1950), Croatian singer

Croatian surnames
Serbian surnames